22nd New York Film Critics Circle Awards
January 19, 1957(announced December 27, 1956)

Around theWorld in Eighty Days
The 22nd New York Film Critics Circle Awards, honored the best filmmaking of 1956.

Winners
Best Film:
Around the World in Eighty Days
Best Actor:
Kirk Douglas - Lust for Life
Best Actress:
Ingrid Bergman - Anastasia
Best Director:
John Huston - Moby Dick
Best Screenplay:
S. J. Perelman - Around the World in Eighty Days
Best Foreign Language Film:
La Strada • Italy

References

External links
1956 Awards

1956
New York Film Critics Circle Awards, 1956
New York Film Critics Circle Awards
New York Film Critics Circle Awards
New York Film Critics Circle Awards
New York Film Critics Circle Awards